Isabelle Despres (born 8. August 1973) is a French slalom canoeist who competed from the early 1990s to the early 2000s. She won a gold medal in the K1 team event at the 1995 ICF Canoe Slalom World Championships in Nottingham.

World Cup individual podiums

References

French female canoeists
Living people
Year of birth missing (living people)
Medalists at the ICF Canoe Slalom World Championships